Geneva Christian College is a K-12 Christian school in Latrobe, outside of Devonport Tasmania.

The school's mission statement is encapsulated in the biblical passage Proverbs 3:6: "In all your ways acknowledge Him and He shall direct your paths."

The school is located just outside Latrobe, situated on 50 hectares of farm and bushland, and utilizes this within its curriculum.

Geneva Christian College is a member of Independent Schools Tasmania.

Construction of the new playground 
In 2022 the old primary school playground was demolished and a new playground was constructed and finished in august.

References

External links

Private primary schools in Tasmania
Nondenominational Christian schools in Tasmania
High schools in Tasmania
Educational institutions established in 1967
1967 establishments in Australia